Self-managed social centers are community spaces which often feature music venues, infoshops, bicycle workshops and free schools. In French, they are termed espace autogéré and in Italian Centro Sociale Autogestito (CSA), or Centro Sociale Occupato Autogestito (CSOA) if squatted. These projects are concrete examples of Temporary Autonomous Zones.

Centers

See also 
 Self-managed social centers in Italy
 Self-managed social centers in the United Kingdom

References 

Infoshops
Social centres
Squatting